Fight the Power: How Hip-Hop Changed the World is a 2023 BBC Studios television documentary  production in collaboration with PBS, presented by Chuck D of Public Enemy. It was broadcast as a four-part  miniseries starting in late January 2023 on BBC Studios' BBC2, with a series run through Black History Month in February 2023. How Hip-Hop Changed the World was occasioned to coincide with the 50th anniversary of hip hop music.

Overview
The documentary concerned the history of rap music and hip-hop culture in the United States, from its origins in the Bronx to mainstream stardom at the turn of the 20th century, to the present day. The documentary focuses a lens on the political aspects and ramifications of Hip-hop music in a reactionary culture.

Episodes
Each 55 minute episode of the four episodes of How Hip-Hop Changed the World covered a different era and its politically charged history.

Reception
The review of the BBC's production debut by the Guardian states, "with ambitions to inform as well as entertain... a trade-off between sociology and musicology: the records say this and sound like that because this is what was happening in the world at the time. In the case of hip-hop, the scene was a more direct response to political circumstances than any popular music before it."
According to the Decider, this documentary will remind viewers of Summer of Soul (...Or, When the Revolution Could Not Be Televised), and "as riots, social injustice, the rise of the Black Power movement, and the voices of Black political and religious leaders raised consciousness, so too did music pick up the narrative."
Writing for Billboard.com, Gail Mitchell concluded: "Overall, Fight the Power: How Hip Hop Changed the World, is a vital living history lesson that can’t be found in any school history books."

See also
Hip-Hop: Beyond Beats and Rhymes (2006)
Summer of Soul (...Or, When the Revolution Could Not Be Televised) (2021)
Something from Nothing: The Art of Rap (2012)

References

External links

American Black Journal

2020s American television miniseries
2023 documentary films
2020s hip hop films
Documentary films about hip hop music and musicians
2020s English-language films
BBC Two
History of civil rights in the United States